Daniel Anthony Ireland (born 30 September 1990) is an Australian football player. He is a goalkeeper who is currently playing with NPL NNSW club, Hamilton Olympic FC.

Career

Coventry City 
He made his professional debut on 13 August 2008 in a 3–1 League Cup win against Aldershot.

Nuneaton Town (loan) 
He joined Nuneaton Town on 3 October for a month's loan, but his loan spell was cut short after playing in two games for the club after he was called up for the Australia U-20 side.

Halesowen Town (loan) 
In December 2008 he joined Halesowen Town on a one-month loan deal, making three appearances before returning to Coventry. He made his first league appearance on 5 March 2011 against Bristol City as a half time replacement for the injured Keiren Westwood.
Ireland was released by Coventry City when his contract ran out at the end of the 2011/2012 season.

Forest Green Rovers (loan) 
In February 2010 Ireland joined Forest Green Rovers on one-month's loan. Ireland impressed in his first month at The New Lawn and the deal was extended until the end of the season.

Lambton Jaffas 

Following his release from Coventry, Ireland returned home to Australia and joined Lambton Jaffas FC, who had recently been promoted to the Northern New South Wales State Football League for the 2013 season. Lambton finished as Runners Up by losing to Broadmeadow Magic in the Grand Final. 
2014 saw Ireland win the inaugural NPL Northern NSW Championship title with Lambton by defeating Weston Workers in the Grand Final.

Hamilton Olympic 
For 2015, Ireland has signed with Hamilton Olympic. By signing Ireland, Newcastle Jets Youth goalkeeper, Jesse Cook, has ended his deal with Hamilton. 2015 sees a goalkeeper swap when former Hamilton goalkeeper Brad Swancott plays for Lambton and Ireland plays for Hamilton. Ireland has returned from trialling with Sydney-based NPL NSW clubs after having secured a job in fund management in Newcastle. When asked about Ireland, Hamilton coach Michael Bolch said, "Danny has been the best keeper in the competition by a mile for the last two seasons. It’s a hard decision, but it’s a specialist position and we decided we would rather sign the best keeper in the competition than play against him."

References

External links
OzFootball profile
Danny Ireland player profile at ccfc.co.uk

Article on contract signing

1990 births
Soccer players from Sydney
Coventry City F.C. players
Nuneaton Borough F.C. players
Halesowen Town F.C. players
Forest Green Rovers F.C. players
National League (English football) players
English Football League players
National Premier Leagues players
Living people
Association football goalkeepers
Australian soccer players
Australian expatriate sportspeople in England
Expatriate footballers in England